Channel Africa is the international broadcasting service of the South African Broadcasting Corporation.

Overview
Airing on shortwave, satellite radio and Internet radio platforms, the service airs news, cultural, sports and public affairs programming focusing on South Africa and the African continent.

Channel Africa evolved out of Radio RSA, a similar service which was closely associated with the South African apartheid regime.

Since the advent of the new democratic dispensation in 1994, Channel Africa, the international radio service of the SABC has been engaged in the process of redefining itself and repositioning itself so that it is in line with the new democratic values underpinning the new South Africa. During this period, Channel Africa was faced with the task of formulating a vision and a mission that would cast the station as a major role player in the field of continental and international broadcasting.

Channel Africa broadcasts live on three platforms; Shortwave, Satellite, and Internet. Its broadcasts are in Chewa, Silozi, Swahili, English, French and Portuguese. The Satellite broadcast is via PAS 10 and is accessible through SENTECH's vivid decoders.

The Shortwave broadcast covers the south, east, central and west Africa. The Satellite broadcast covers the sub-Saharan region although it can be picked as far as London. The Internet broadcast covers the entire world.

 Programming from Channel Africa last aired on the World Radio Network in 2007.

 Channel Africa French and English language services. Final Shortwave Broadcasts from Meyerton Site : 29 March 2019. - Short Wave Archive

External links
 Channel Africa Official website
 Live Stream

Broadcasting in South Africa
International broadcasters
Radio stations in Johannesburg
Radio stations established in 1992
State media